The Compagnie d'Arc d'Amiens is an archery club founded on 14 November 1803 in Amiens and affiliated to the  and the .

History

Urban Militia 
The armed troops were instituted for the defense and the police of the city of Amiens shortly after 1117, following the victory of the rebels against the seigniorial tyranny. The archers of the urban militia of Amiens were grouped in a group called the Grand Oath (Grand Serment), which consisted of 90 men recruited from the most notable families of the bourgeoisie. On an unknown date, perhaps towards the end of the fifteenth century, a Little Oath (Petit Serment) was made up, made up of 60 men. The members of the Oaths had to swear during their admissions to respect the Statutes of the group, the authority of the Captain and that of the city's Mayor. These 150 archers formed, with 60 crossbowmen, the specialized troops of the small municipal army. With the advent of firearms at the end of the 16th century, 60 arquebusiers and 80 couleuvriniers were added to their ranks.

The Oaths were religious associations placed under the patronage of Saint Sebastian for the Grand Oath and Saint Christine for the Petit Oath, both killed by being riddled with arrows.

The archers of the city were deployed in the service of the King on numerous occasions, in particular at the battle of Bouvines in 1214. During the Hundred Years' War, they were opposed several times, to the English archers, better armed, their bows being high two meters allowed their arrows to be sent over two hundred meters.

The Garden of the Grand Oath (Jardin du Grand Serment) is located against the ramparts from the 15th century to 1790, today from the Baraban bridge to the Célestins bridge. The  (Bird shooting) was practiced there, then after the seventeenth century the Tir au berceau. The name of the rue des Archers (Archer's street) is a last memory of this garden. In this place, the militia organized once a year a contest whose goal was to touch a 3D representation of a bird, the first archer to succeed was named Roy for the year. If an archer succeeded three years in a row, he became Emperor. These titles gave rise to honors and privileges. This discipline is still practiced today, a title of Roitelet was even added for young people.

Peaceful meetings took place between Oaths from different cities, even distant ones. These games were called the Noble Days (Nobles jours). The messenger bringing the invitation received gifts, money or jewels from the municipality.

Privileged company 

The progress of armaments involves the disappearance of the bow in favor of the arquebus. Archers were still commissioned at the time of Louis XIV, notably at the siege of Arras, Saint-Omer or Dunkirk, but only to escort prisoners or ammunition convoy.

The Oath loses its militia status and becomes a privileged Company. The advantages of archers are however maintained: exemptions from taxes and charges, watchtower, accommodation for warriors. They benefited in particular from the Franc salé (salty Franc): they did not pay, on the salt they bought, the heavy tax of Gabelle du sel. These advantages had made them called the Franc-archer. In return, the city only asked them for fairly sparse police or ceremonial services. They must place themselves at the disposal of the authority in case of alarms, fires, riots ... They take rank in uniform with their weapons at religious or civil events: Feast of Corpus Christi, Saint John's Eve, Te Deum and fireworks on anniversary of victories, entries of great figures...

The archers no longer wore either helmets or chain mail, but a white cloth coat with blue faces trimmed with silver; blue vest, panties and stockings; white and blue plumed tricorne; white wool epaulettes; the sword at the side; on the chest, a medal bearing the image of Saint Sebastian.

During the parade, at the head of their procession, we find the drums and the fifes followed by the Banner Holder. The banner embroidered with the date of 1733 has entered the Musée de Picardie.

During 17th century the Tir au Berceau became a regular practice, but the annual Tir à l'oiseau competition was maintained. Meetings with foreign companies are no longer called Noble Days, but Provincial Prices or General Prices, depending on the distance from the participating cities.

While the old Statutes were drawn up by each Oath and therefore differed from city to city, a common law was accepted by almost all the Companies in the 18th century. It is still in place today after some modifications over time. It is the General Regulations in 70 articles, published in 1733 by Henri Charles Arnauld de Pomponne, Abbot of Saint-Médard de Soissons, who qualified himself as Grand Master of the Archery of the Arc in France because the relics of Saint Sebastian were brought to his Abbey in 840.

The French Revolution suppressed all associations. The Privileged Companies were dissolved on June 13, 1790 and their property was sold on January 16, 1792.

Sport Association 
At the beginning of the 19th century, the archers regrouped in a Society for leisure and sports. The Fundamental Company of the Knights and Archers of Amiens (Compagnie fondamentale des chevaliers et archers d'Amiens) was created on November 14, 1803, by the descendants of Officers of the Company of the 18th century, Gérard and Madaré.

The city of Amiens owned up to four associations of archers simultaneously. When the train station was established in 1845, railway workers formed a Société du Nord (Society of North) which had land at the corner of the Voirie and Boulevard de l'Est (currently Boulevard d'Alsace Lorraine). This society was fleeting.

In 1903, for the centenary of the reorganization of the company, a banner is offered to them, it will be blessed by the Daveluy abbey.

The Fundamental Company of the Knights and Archers of Amiens remains the company which has known how to last over time despite the changes of premises. It had to change its location, staying in turn: at Bastion de Longueville, Rue du Vivier, near by Boulevard Fontaine (currently Boulevard Carnot), on Bastion de Guyencourt, in the old ditch against Boulevard Saint-Jacques (currently Boulevard Faidherbe). In 1913, the patron of Amiens Edmond Soyez financed the current stand, 15 rue de Lannoy.

The archer no longer has a uniform, but he must wear a cap decorated with a few archery emblems. Companies are federated into Regional Rounds: that of Amiens is part of the Ronde de Picardie formed by 24 Companies. This celebration is the opening day of a competition between Companies of the Round which takes place every Sunday of the summer. The first was organized in 1903 for the centenary of the Company.

Today 
The official club outfit is white pants, a white polo shirt, with the club logo on the chest and Amiens written in red on the back.

In 2012, the club had 95 licensees.

Organization 
 Captain / President: Paul Foulon
 Lieutenant / Vice-President: Claude Cagé
 Treasurer: Christian Trefcon
 Vice-Treasurer: Arnaud Jesson
 Secretary: Elise Foulon
 Vice-Secretary: Nathalie Dupont
 Board's members: 
 Christine Thomas
 Eric Cadran
 Gautier Gente
 Pascal Gerbet
 Laurent Coffinier
 Sébastien Tétu

Formers Captains

Events 
The club organize an indoor, an outdoor/Fédéral and a field competition every year, usually in the Samara Arboretum, and a junior competition.

Internal events 
Sinde 1978, this competition is also open to children who can become Roitelet(te). A variant has also been created for compound bows, the winner win a K d'or.

Bouquet provincial 

The  (provincial bouquet) has been organized in Amiens five times, in 1893, 1899, 1903, 1911 and 1939.

In 1899, 100 companies participate with a total of 1500 archers.

On 7 May 1911, the parade take place in front of Amiens Cathedral.

Championnat de France 2012 
This is the first France championship organized in Amiens. The company receives the 2012 sports event award (prix de la manifestation sportive 2012) for this event. The results for Recurve bow are:

Infrastructures

Jeu d'arc 

Since 1913, thanks to the patron Edmond Soyez, the association's head office is located at 15 rue de Lannoy in Amiens. The second jeu d'arc was offered to the company by the constable Gérard De Berny (1880-1957). As the association is the owner, the training sessions are open to the public without any schedule restrictions for club members. This place includes a salle d'armes (weapon's room) where archers can mount their bows, and 2 jeu d'arc with a distance of about 50 meters each. The total length of this place is therefore about 120 meters. For a width of about 8 meters, the land being located between the houses.

Gymnasium 

For the winter season, trainings sessions takes place at the Jean Renaux gymnasium in the north district of Amiens. Its length allows shots up to 40 meters. The indoor competitions organized during the year by the club generally take place in this gymnasium.

Honours

National

Championnat de France de tir fédéral

Championnat de France de tir nature

Championnat de France de tir 3D

Championnat de France de tir Beursault

Championnat de France de tir sur cible en plein air

Championnat de France universitaire

International

World Firefighters Games

World Police and Fire Games

World Field Archery Championships

European Field Archery Championships

Further reading

External links

Notes and references

Notes

References 

Sports clubs in France
Archery in France
Sports clubs established in the 1800s
1803 establishments in France